Illwill is the eighth studio album by the Swedish band Lake of Tears.

Track listing

Personnel
Daniel Brennare - vocals, guitars
Fredrik Jordanius - bass, guitars, vocals
Johan Oudhuis - drums

Additional personnel
Mathias Lodmalm - vocals
Johan Örnborg - guitars, producer, engineering, mixing
Freddy Zielinsky - bass
Jens Bogren - mastering
Anton Hedberg - photography
Björn Gustaffson - artwork, layout

External links

http://www.metalstorm.net/pub/review.php?review_id=9103 

2011 albums
Lake of Tears albums